Mirpur Royals is a franchise cricket team that represents Mirpur, Azad Kashmir in the Kashmir Premier League. They were coached by Inzamam-ul-Haq and captained by Shoaib Malik.

Squad

Season standings

Points table

League fixtures and results

Playoffs

Eliminator 1

Eliminator 2

Statistics

Most runs 

Source: Score360

Most wickets 

Source: Score360

References

External links
Team Records 2021 at ESPNcricinfo

Kashmir Premier League (Pakistan)